Restless is the third studio album by American rapper Trae. It was released on June 27, 2006, by G-Maab Entertainment, Rap-A-Lot Records, Asylum Records, and Atlantic Records. Despite the album becoming Trae's third official release through his independently-owned record label, G-Maab Entertainment, Restless serves as Trae's first commercial record to be released through Rap-A-Lot Records, Asylum Records, and Atlantic Records.

Music and lyrics
The album's ninth track, "The Truth", features a added guest verse from a fellow American rapper 2Pac, and 2Pac's verse on "The Truth" occurs to be the same verse that 2Pac originally recorded for the song, "Dumpin, from which was taken from 2Pac's posthumously-released studio album, Pac's Life (2006).

Reception

About.com named Restless as one of the top 100 rap albums of the 2000s.

Track listing

Sample credits
"Screw Done Already Warned Me" contains a sample of "B****es Ain't S***" performed by DJ Screw
"Restless" contains a sample of "The Overture of Foxy Brown" performed by Willie Hutch
"Swang" contains samples of "The Lady in My Life" performed by Michael Jackson, and "25 Lighters" performed by DJ DMD
"Cadillac" contains a sample of "N Luv wit My Money" performed by Paul Wall and Chamillionaire
"No Help" contains a sample of "Your Child" performed by Mary J. Blige

Charts

Singles

References

2006 albums
Trae tha Truth albums
Rap-A-Lot Records albums
Albums produced by Mike Dean (record producer)